The Lost Tribes is a compilation of rare material by A Tribe Called Quest, released in Japan. As of 2006, "ICU (Doin It)" was the most recent Tribe song, which was released in 2003. "That Shit" is the only A Tribe Called Quest song released with vocals by Jay Dee. "Scenario (Remix)" was the B-side to the original. The original version of "Jam" can be found on Beats, Rhymes and Life, as well as the original "Stressed Out".

Track listing
"Oh My God (UK Flavor Radio Mix)"
"Mardi Gras at Midnight" (Feat. Rah Digga)
"The Remedy" (Feat. Common)
"Can I Kick It? (Phase 5 Mix)" (Denmark)
"Stressed Out Remix (Baby Phife Version)"
"Scenario (Remix)" (Feat. Leaders of the New School)
"ICU (Doin' It)" (Feat. Erykah Badu)
"It's Yours"
"Jam (Remix)" (Feat. Consequence)
"Game Day" (Feat. Rodney Hampton)
"Glamour & Glitz"
"Weekendz" (Feat. Consequence)
"Hey"
"Rumble in the Jungle" (Feat. Busta Rhymes, John Forté & Fugees)
"Practice Session"
"That Shit" (Feat. Jay Dee) (bonus track)

A Tribe Called Quest albums
Hip hop compilation albums
Albums produced by J Dilla
Albums produced by Q-Tip (musician)
2006 compilation albums